1st Alkino (1-se Alkin) is a rural locality (a village) in Dmitriyevsky Selsoviet of Blagovarsky District, Russia. The  population was 2 as of 2010.

Geography 
1st Alkino is located 58 km west of Yazykovo (the district's administrative centre) by road. Obshchina is the nearest rural locality.

Ethnicity 
The village is inhabited by Ukrainians and Russians.

Streets 
 Polevaya

References

External links 
 Council of Municipalities of the Republic of Bashkortostan (official website)

Rural localities in Blagovarsky District